Histone deacetylase 11 is a 39kDa histone deacetylase enzyme that in humans is encoded by the HDAC11 gene on chromosome 3 in humans and chromosome 6 in mice.

It is the only Class IV HDAC since it is not highly homologous with either Rpd3 or hda1 yeast enzymes and so does not fit into either Class I or Class II. It is the smallest HDAC isoform and it was first described in 2002.

Function 

Histone deacetylases, such as HDAC11, control DNA expression by modifying the core histone octamers that package DNA into dense chromatin structures and repress gene expression.[supplied by OMIM]

HDAC11 expression is normally found in brain and testis tissue, but upregulation of HDAC11 expression has also been seen in various cancer cells.

HDAC11 has been shown to be a negative regulator of IL-10 production in antigen presenting cells. It has also been shown that inhibition of HDAC11 results in increased expression of OX40L in Hodgkin lymphoma cells.

Interactions 

HDAC11 has been shown to interact with HDAC6.

See also 
 Histone deacetylase

References

Further reading

External links 
 

EC 3.5.1